Klarobelia lucida is a species of plant in the Annonaceae family. It is endemic to Ecuador.  Its natural habitat is subtropical or tropical dry forests. It is threatened by habitat loss.

References

Flora of Ecuador
lucida
Endangered plants
Taxonomy articles created by Polbot